Rodrigão (born 1979) is a Brazilian volleyball player, 2004 Olympic champion

Rodrigão may also refer to:

 Rodrigo Archanjo de Matos (born 1983), Brazilian football player
 Rodrigo Dias Carneiro (born 1972), Brazilian football player
 Rodrigo Fernandes Alflen (born 1978), Brazilian football player
 Rodrigo Gomes dos Santos (born 1993), Brazilian football player
 Rodrigo de Souza Prado (born 1995), Brazilian football player